The 2017 Kohler Grand Prix was an IndyCar Series event held at Road America in Elkhart Lake, Wisconsin. The race served as the 10th round of the 2017 IndyCar Series season. Hélio Castroneves qualified on pole position for the race, while Scott Dixon took victory.

Background
For the 2017 event, the length of the race was extended by five laps. 

Just prior to the race, Mikhail Aleshin ran into issues with his visa that temporarily prevented him from entering the United States following his participation in the 2017 24 Hours of Le Mans in France. DTM driver Robert Wickens was placed on stand-by to fill in for Aleshin if his issues were unable to be cleared in time for the race. Wickens completed practice in the No. 7 car, but Aleshin's visa issued were resolved shortly, allowing him to arrive at the track on Friday night and compete in all remaining sessions during the race weekend.

Qualifying
Qualifying for the race took place on Saturday, June 24. Hélio Castroneves secured his 50th career pole position at an average speed of 143.85 mph (231.52 km/h) as Team Penske locked out the front two rows of the field, with Will Power starting second, Josef Newgarden third, and Simon Pagenaud fourth. Scott Dixon qualified fifth, making him fastest of cars outside of the Penske stable.

Race
The race was held on Sunday, June 25. The start of the race saw Hélio Castroneves hold his lead, while Josef Newgarden managed to get around Will Power for second. Scott Dixon managed to get around Simon Pagenaud during the opening lap as well, while further back, Spencer Pigot suffered a broken front-wing after making contact with Ryan Hunter-Reay. This order remained intact for several laps, though Dixon pressured Power for the third position for several laps. On lap 6, some drivers, including Alexander Rossi, Graham Rahal, and Mikhail Aleshin began stops for what would be a four-stop strategy for them. The leaders, electing to use a three-stop strategy, did not pit until around lap 13. After the first stops, Castroneves held a narrow lead over Newgarden, while Dixon and Rossi both leapfrogged Power to take third and fourth place, respectively. Shortly thereafter, Pagenaud moved by Power, dropping Power out of the top five.

On lap 20, Newgarden was able to move around Castroneves and pull away, placing himself solidly in the lead. Castroneves soon began falling into the clutches of Dixon and Pagenaud when the second round of stops for the leaders came at lap 27. During the stops, Newgarden maintained his lead, but now was ahead of Dixon in second. Nearly immediately after the completion of the first round of stops came the race's first caution period as Takuma Sato spun and made contact with the wall in turn 11 on lap 29, though was able to continue after getting a bump start from the safety team. During the caution, the drivers on the four-stop strategy elected to pit. 

The restart saw Dixon swing around the outside of Newgarden through turn 1 and successfully grab the lead, with Castroneves moving past Newgarden a few turns later. The top five remained the same until the final round of stops on around lap 41. Dixon maintained his lead of the race, while Newgarden successfully moved back around his teammate to put him back in second. Castroneves, Pagenaud, and Power rounded out the top five. On lap 45, the race saw its second caution period, as Tony Kanaan crashed heavily in turn 11 after breaking his front wing in an attempt to pass Alexander Rossi. 

The restart came at lap 48 with the front runners remaining in the same order. Further back, Rossi, dealing with damage from the previous incident, was pushed off course and dropped down to 12th. Up front, no one was able to challenge Dixon for the remainder of the race, allowing him to secure his 41st career IndyCar victory, but his first of the 2017 season. Newgarden came across the line in second, while Castroneves came across the line third. Pagenaud and Power rounded out the top five. Dixon's victory allowed him to extend his lead in the championship, placing him 34 points ahead of Pagenaud.

Report

Qualifying

Source for individual rounds:

Race

 Points include 1 point for leading at least 1 lap during a race, an additional 2 points for leading the most race laps, and 1 point for Pole Position.

Source for time gaps:

Championship standings

Driver standings

Manufacturer standings

 Note: Only the top five positions are included.

References

External links
Pit Stop Data
Official Race Broadcast

Kohler Grand Prix
Kohler Grand Prix
2017 Kohler Grand Prix
Kohler Grand Prix